Fish Go Deep are an Irish production duo consisting of Greg Dowling and Shane Johnson from Cork city. They have been releasing house records under this name since 1997 and in 2006 reached number 1 on both the UK dance chart and indie chart and also reached number 23 in the singles chart with their track "The Cure and the Cause".

Both Dowling and Johnson played an integral part in the emergence of house music in Cork City between 1988 and 2001, and ran the "Sweat" night at Sir Henrys, which attracted acts such as Kerri Chandler, Arnold Jarvis, Laurent Garnier, DJ Deep, Jerome Sydenham, Roger Sanchez, Glenn Underground, Boo Williams, Cajmere, Gemini, Derrick May, Kevin Yost, Migs, Rasoul and Fred Everything.

Discography

Albums

Singles and EPs

References

Sources

 Fish Go Deep Interview on DHN (2004). Retrieved 23 August 2008.
 DHN Article on Go Deep in Fast Eddies. Retrieved 23 August 2008.
 Fish Go Deep Interview on NiteFeva.com. Retrieved 24 August 2008.

External links
Fish Go Deep's Official Website

Fish Go Deep at ConnectedTalent.com

Irish record producers
Irish dance musicians
Irish house musicians
Irish house music groups
Irish musical duos
Record production teams
Electronic dance music duos
Remixers
Club DJs
DJs from Cork (city)
Musical groups from Cork (city)
Deep house musicians